In Chinese history, Eastern Barbarians may refer to:
Dongyi 東夷, various ethnic groups to the East of China
Donghu people 東胡, an ancient ethnic group